Vince Dwyer was an Australian professional rugby league footballer who played in the 1920s and 1930s.  Dwyer played for Western Suburbs, Canterbury-Bankstown and Newtown.  Dwyer was a foundation player for Canterbury-Bankstown.

Playing career
Dwyer made his first grade debut for Western Suburbs in Round 16 1929 against Glebe at Wentworth Park.  In 1930, Dwyer signed for Newtown and played in 5 games for the club scoring 3 tries.  After 4 years out of first grade, Dwyer signed with newly admitted side Canterbury-Bankstown.

Dwyer played for the club in their first ever game against North Sydney at North Sydney Oval which finished in a 20-5 loss.

Canterbury-Bankstown finished the 1935 season in second last position narrowly avoiding the wooden spoon which was handed to University but Dwyer did finish as the club's top try scorer with 4 tries.

References

Newtown Jets players
Canterbury-Bankstown Bulldogs players
Western Suburbs Magpies players
Rugby league players from Sydney
Rugby league wingers
Rugby league centres
Year of birth missing
Place of birth missing
Year of death missing
Place of death missing